Pedioplanis gaerdesi, known commonly as the Kaokoland sand lizard, the Kaokoveld sand lizard, and Mayer's sand lizard, is a species of lizard in the family Lacertidae. The species is endemic to Namibia.

Etymology
The specific name, gaerdesi, is in honor of German zoologist Jan Gaerdes (1889–1981), who lived in Namibia for many years.

Geographic range
P. gaerdesi is found in northwestern Namibia.

Habitat
The natural habitat of P. gaerdesi is desert.

Description
The tail is very long, almost three times SVL. Dorsally, P. gaerdesi is golden brown. Ventrally, it is cream-colored. The flanks are spotted with yellow. The transparent "window" of the lower eyelid, which consist of one large scale, is ringed with black.

Reproduction
P. gaerdesi is oviparous.

References

Further reading
, Branch WR, Haacke WD (1993). "The herpetofauna of the Kamanjab area and adjacent Damaraland, Namibia". Madoqua, Windhoek 18 (2): 117–145. (Pedioplanis gaerdesi, new status).
Conradie W, Measey GJ, Branch WR, Tolley KA (2012). "Revised phylogeny of African sand lizards (Pedioplanis), with the description of two new species from south-western Angola". African Journal of Herpetology 61 (2): 91–112.
Herrmann H-W, Branch WR (2013). "Fifty years of herpetological research in the Namib Desert and Namibia with an updated and annotated species checklist". Journal of Arid Environments 93: 94–115.
Mertens R (1954). "Neue Eidechsen aus Südwest-Afrika". Senckenbergiana 34: 175–183. (Eremias undata gaerdesi, new subspecies, p. 176). (in German).

Pedioplanis
Lacertid lizards of Africa
Reptiles of Namibia
Endemic fauna of Namibia
Reptiles described in 1954
Taxa named by Robert Mertens